Escort destroyer (DDE) is a US Navy post World War II classification for destroyers (DD) modified for and assigned to escort fleets.

Escort destroyer may also refer to:
 , a class of destroyers of the Royal Navy designed to escort convoys
 , a class of escort destroyers operated by the Royal Australian Navy
 , a grouping of similar classes of Royal Navy First World War destroyers used for convoy escort in the Second World War
 , a class of fleet escorts used by the Kriegsmarine during the Second World War
  escort destroyers built by the Imperial Japanese Navy not intended to work with the fleet
  escort destroyers built by the Imperial Japanese Navy not intended to work with the fleet

See also
Destroyer escort, a US Navy classification for a smaller, lightly armed warship designed to be used to escort convoys of merchant marine ships
Royal Navy#Escort units, the escort fleet, in the form of frigates and destroyers
Destroyer escort (disambiguation)
Ocean escort